Safra-ye Moqaddam (also Romanized as Şafrā-ye Moqaddam and Şafrā-e Maqadam; also known as Şafrā) is a village in Buzi Rural District, in the Central District of Shadegan County, Khuzestan Province, Iran. As of the 2006 census, its population was 295, in 63 families.

References 

Populated places in Shadegan County